The 1979 LPGA Tour was the 30th season since the LPGA Tour officially began in 1950. The season ran from February 15 to November 3 and consisted of 35 official money events. Nancy Lopez won the most tournaments, eight, and led the money list with earnings of $197,489.

There were five first-time winners in 1979: Jerilyn Britz, Beth Daniel, Vicki Fergon, Pat Meyers, and Penny Pulz. This was the first year that the Peter Jackson Classic (now called the Canadian Women's Open) was classified as an LPGA major.

Hall of famer Judy Rankin gained her 26th victory in August, which was her final tour win.

The Women's Kemper Open saw the first ever five-way playoff in LPGA Tour history. It was won by JoAnne Carner. Later in the year, The Coca-Cola Classic, was also decided in a five-way playoff.

The tournament results and award winners are listed below.

Tournament results
The following table shows all the official money events for the 1979 season. "Date" is the ending date of the tournament. The numbers in parentheses after the winners' names are the number of wins they had on the tour up to and including that event. Majors are shown in bold.

Awards

References

External links
LPGA Tour official site
1979 season coverage at golfobserver.com

LPGA Tour seasons
LPGA Tour